The 26th parallel north is a circle of latitude that is 26 degrees north of the Earth's equatorial plane. It crosses Africa, Asia, the Indian Ocean, the Pacific Ocean, North America and the Atlantic Ocean.

A section of the border between Western Sahara and Mauritania is defined by the parallel.

It is the most populous parallel on Earth, being home to between 247.2 million and 248.0 million people as of 2019. 

At this latitude the sun is visible for 13 hours, 46 minutes during the summer solstice and 10 hours, 31 minutes during the winter solstice. The sun is at 40.17 degrees in the sky during the winter solstice and 87.83 degrees in the sky during the summer solstice.

Around the world
Starting at the Prime Meridian and heading eastwards, the parallel 26° north passes through:

{| class="wikitable plainrowheaders"
! scope="col" width="125" | Co-ordinates
! scope="col" | Country, territory or sea
! scope="col" | Notes
|-
| 
! scope="row" | 
|
|-
| 
! scope="row" | 
|
|-
| 
! scope="row" | 
|
|-
| style="background:#b0e0e6;" | 
! scope="row" style="background:#b0e0e6;" | Red Sea
| style="background:#b0e0e6;" |
|-
| 
! scope="row" | 
|
|-
| style="background:#b0e0e6;" | 
! scope="row" style="background:#b0e0e6;" | Persian Gulf
| style="background:#b0e0e6;" | Gulf of Bahrain
|-
| 
! scope="row" | 
|
|-
| style="background:#b0e0e6;" | 
! scope="row" style="background:#b0e0e6;" | Persian Gulf
| style="background:#b0e0e6;" | Gulf of Bahrain
|-
| 
! scope="row" | 
|
|-valign="top"
| style="background:#b0e0e6;" | 
! scope="row" style="background:#b0e0e6;" | Persian Gulf
| style="background:#b0e0e6;" | Passing between the islands of Bani Forur and Sirri,  Passing between the Tunb Islands and the island of Abu Musa, controlled by but claimed by 
|-
| 
! scope="row" | 
|
|-
| 
! scope="row" | 
| Musandam peninsula
|-
| style="background:#b0e0e6;" | 
! scope="row" style="background:#b0e0e6;" | Indian Ocean
| style="background:#b0e0e6;" | Gulf of Oman
|-
| 
! scope="row" | 
|
|-valign="top"
| 
! scope="row" | 
| Balochistan Sindh
|-valign="top"
| 
! scope="row" | 
| Rajasthan Madhya Pradesh Uttar Pradesh Bihar West Bengal
|-
| 
! scope="row" | 
|
|-
| 
! scope="row" | 
| West Bengal – for about 4 km
|-
| 
! scope="row" | 
|
|-valign="top"
| 
! scope="row" | 
| Assam Meghalaya Assam Nagaland
|-
| 
! scope="row" |  (Burma)
|
|-valign="top"
| 
! scope="row" | 
| Yunnan Guizhou Guangxi Hunan (passing between Guangxi and Hunan several times) Jiangxi Fujian — passing just south of Fuzhou
|-
| style="background:#b0e0e6;" | 
! scope="row" style="background:#b0e0e6;" | East China Sea
| style="background:#b0e0e6;" | Passing just north of the disputed Senkaku Islands
|-valign="top"
| style="background:#b0e0e6;" | 
! scope="row" style="background:#b0e0e6;" | Pacific Ocean
| style="background:#b0e0e6;" | Passing just south of the island of Okinawa,  Passing just north of the island of Kita Daito,  Passing just south of Lisianski Island, Hawaii,  Passing just north of the atoll of Laysan, Hawaii, 
|-
| 
! scope="row" | 
| Baja California Sur
|-
| style="background:#b0e0e6;" | 
! scope="row" style="background:#b0e0e6;" | Gulf of California
| style="background:#b0e0e6;" |
|-
| 
! scope="row" | 
| Baja California Sur – Isla Carmen
|-
| style="background:#b0e0e6;" | 
! scope="row" style="background:#b0e0e6;" | Gulf of California
| style="background:#b0e0e6;" |
|-valign="top"
| 
! scope="row" | 
| Sinaloa Chihuahua Durango Coahuila Nuevo León Tamaulipas - passing just south of Reynosa
|-
| 
! scope="row" | 
| Texas - Passing through Brownsville
|-
| style="background:#b0e0e6;" | 
! scope="row" style="background:#b0e0e6;" | Gulf of Mexico
| style="background:#b0e0e6;" |
|-
| 
! scope="row" | 
| Florida – passing through Hollywood (between Fort Lauderdale and Miami)
|-
| style="background:#b0e0e6;" | 
! scope="row" style="background:#b0e0e6;" | Atlantic Ocean
| style="background:#b0e0e6;" |
|-
| 
! scope="row" | 
| Island of Great Abaco
|-
| style="background:#b0e0e6;" | 
! scope="row" style="background:#b0e0e6;" | Atlantic Ocean
| style="background:#b0e0e6;" |
|-
| 
! scope="row" | Western Sahara
|-valign="top"
| 
! scope="row" | Western Sahara /  border
|
|-
| 
! scope="row" | 
|
|-
| 
! scope="row" | 
|
|}

See also
25th parallel north
27th parallel north

References

n26
Mauritania–Western Sahara border